Rosemary J. Coombe is a Canadian anthropologist and lawyer, She is a professor in the Department of Anthropology at York University and Tier 1 Canada Research Chair in Law, Communication and Cultural Studies. Previously, she was a full professor in the Faculty of Law at the University of Toronto.

Education
Coombe earned her J.S.D. from Stanford University.

Career
She was a faculty member at the University of Toronto (UofT) for 12 years before accepting a position at York University in 2001 as their  Tier 1 Canada Research Chair in Law, Communication and Cultural Studies. Before leaving UofT, she published "The Cultural Life of Intellectual Properties: Authorship, Appropriation and the Law" through the Duke University Press. Three years later, she accepted an Ida Beam Visiting Professorship from the University of Iowa. Coombe was renewed as a Tier 1 Canada Research Chair (CRC) in Law, Communication and Cultural Studies in 2009.

In 2013, Coombe co-edited "Dynamic Fair Dealing: Creating Canadian Culture Online" through the University of Toronto Press. She was again renewed as a Tier 1 Canada Research Chair in 2016. That year, she was also recognized by York as a Research Leader. Two years later, she was a T. C. Bierne Visiting Fellow at the University of Queensland's TC Beirne School of Law. Coombe is also part of the  Intellectual Property Issues in Cultural Heritage research team.

Selected publications
The following is a list of selected publications:
Intellectual property: casebook (1988)
Cultural appropriations: authorship, alterity, and the law (1998)
Copyright law: course materials (1998)
Cultural appropriations : intellectual property laws and the cultural politics of postmodernism.' (1994)Copyright, neighbouring rights and moral rights (2000)Dynamic Fair Dealing: Creating Canadian Culture Online (2013)

Rosemary J. Coombe has written about many important elements within the realm of intellectual property law. In her writing, Coombe focuses on the social and cultural implications of intellectual property law and its constraints. Coombe has written many articles addressing these topics. For example, Coombe wrote Objects of Property and Subjects of Politics: Intellectual Property Laws and Democratic Dialogue'', 69 Tex. L. Rev. 1853 (1991). This article highlighted the relationship between democratic freedoms, copyright concepts, and the subsequent effects that stifle cultural expression.

References

External links
CV

Living people
University of Toronto alumni
Stanford University alumni
University of Western Ontario alumni
Academic staff of the University of Toronto
Academic staff of York University
Canadian women academics
Canadian women non-fiction writers
21st-century Canadian women writers
Canada Research Chairs
Canadian women lawyers
Canadian anthropologists
Canadian women anthropologists
Year of birth missing (living people)